Rotson Kilambe (born August 6, 1978, in Kitwe) is a retired Zambian footballer.

Career
A striker, Kilambe played in South Africa for Kaizer Chiefs, Bloemfontein Celtic and Mamelodi Sundowns and for Power Dynamos and Yunnan Hongta and Zanaco F.C. in his native Zambia.

Kilambe made his debut for the Zambia national football team in 1998 and has since played a major part in his country's successes. He played at the 1998 and 2000 African Nation Cup Finals.

In September 2001, he was suspended for 6 months from international football since he tested positive for cannabis use, following a World Cup qualifier against Cameroon. Kilambe was the first African player to be banned by FIFA on doping related charges. The ban denied him the chance of playing at the African Nations Cup Finals in Mali.

See also
List of sportspeople sanctioned for doping offences

References

http://zambiafootball.com

1978 births
Living people
People from Kitwe
Zambian footballers
Doping cases in association football
Zambian expatriate footballers
Zambia international footballers
2000 African Cup of Nations players
Zambian sportspeople in doping cases
Zambian expatriate sportspeople in South Africa
Expatriate soccer players in South Africa
Mamelodi Sundowns F.C. players
Bloemfontein Celtic F.C. players
Kaizer Chiefs F.C. players
Association football forwards
Expatriate footballers in China
Yunnan Hongta players
Zambian expatriate sportspeople in China
Power Dynamos F.C. players
Zanaco F.C. players